Port McNeill is a town in the North Island region of Vancouver Island, British Columbia, Canada with a population of 2,356 (2021). Located on Vancouver Island's north-east shore on Queen Charlotte Strait, it was originally a base camp for loggers. Port McNeill became a settlement in 1936. The town was named after Captain William Henry McNeill of the Hudson's Bay Company.

Demographics 

Religion 
According to the 2021 census, religious groups in Port McNeill included:
Irreligion (1,545 persons or 65.9%)
Christianity (730 persons or 31.1%)
Buddhism (10 persons or 0.4%)

Tourism and location 
Along with housing the headquarters of the Regional District of Mount Waddington, Port McNeill acts as a central hub for all of North Vancouver Island. It offers the only access to the villages of Alert Bay (Cormorant Island) and Sointula (Malcolm Island) via BC Ferries which run daily. Port McNeill Airport is located just 5 minutes South on highway 19.

The town is also a popular tourism destination during the summer, with a large population of animals including black bear, cougar, elk and deer. The town also features a museum and a history revolving around logging.

Other information 
Accounting for 25.7% of the labour force, logging remains the primary employer in Port McNeill and contributes approximately 8% of the total BC timber harvest. The main contractors are Western Forest Products and LeMare Lake Logging. Port McNeill is also the home of the world's largest burl.

February 2007 marked the opening day of Orca Sand & Gravel LP, the largest sand and gravel quarry in the northern hemisphere. Material is shipped via 70,000 tonne container ships to ports in California and Hawaii and via 7000 tonne barges to Vancouver.

Kwagis Power, owned by Brookfield Renewable Power and the 'Namgis First Nation, constructed a 45 megawatt hydroelectric facility on the Kokish River near Port McNeill. The Steelhead Society of B.C. and the Western Canada Wilderness Committee opposed the project. The project was completed early 2014.

Port McNeill is the hometown of Willie Mitchell, a former NHL defenceman, and is also the birthplace of former NHL defenceman Clayton Stoner.

Port McNeill is also the hometown of Thomas Symons, Canada's rookie representation at the 2022 STIHL World Timbersports Championship, which begins May 27, in Vienna, Austria.

The first, second and fourth seasons of History channel television show Alone were filmed in the forest outside Port McNeill. The third season filmed in Patagonia and featured local female resident, Megan Hanacek.

References

External links 

Populated places on the British Columbia Coast
Towns in British Columbia
Northern Vancouver Island
Populated places in the Regional District of Mount Waddington